Maignaut-Tauzia (Gascon: Manhaut e Tausiar) is a commune in the Gers department in southwestern France.

Geography

Population

See also
Communes of the Gers department

References

External links

Communes of Gers